Romeo C. dela Cruz (born 15 November 1936) is a Filipino lawyer who served as the  Solicitor General of the Philippines in 1998.

Early life and education
Romeo de la Cruz was born on 15 November 1936 in Urdaneta, Pangasinan, Philippines.  He attended the University of the Philippines where he earned a Bachelor of Laws degree. He passed the Philippine Bar Examination in 1957, placing 9th among the top scores that year.

Career 
After beginning his practice of law, de la Cruz became an adjudicator in the Manila office of the United States Department of Veterans Affairs. He then joined the Office of the Solicitor General in 1974 and was appointed the Assistant Solicitor General in 1979. In February 1998, the Solicitor General's position was vacant when Silvestre H. Bello III became the acting Secretary of Justice. de la Cruz then served as the Solicitor General from February 10, 1998 until June 8, 1998 until Bello returned to the post. During four months as Solicitor General, Cruz handled cases concerning the expanded value added tax, light rail transit III, the police reorganization, and the constitutionality of the  death penalty.

References

External links 
Complaint Acting Solicitor General Romeo C. de la Cruz versus Judge Carlito A. Eisma
news article - Romeo C. de la Cruz mentioned in case against TMA Australian Pty Ltd
News article - Solicitor General Romeo C. de la Cruz states conviction of Imelda Marcos was erroneous

1936 births
Solicitors General of the Philippines
People from Urdaneta, Pangasinan
20th-century Filipino lawyers
Living people
Ramos administration personnel
List of University of the Philippines College of Law alumni